Muchlis Hadi Ning Syaifulloh (born 26 October 1996) is a Second Police Brigadier in the Indonesian National Police.

Club career

PSM Makassar 
On 17 December 2013, Muchlis signed a four-year contract with PSM Makassar. However, in the 2014 season, he was not able to make his debut as being the focus of the Indonesia U-19 team for the 2014 AFC U-19 Championship. In next season, he scored on his debut, a goal coming in the 74th minute against Persiba Balikpapan, after replacing Johan Yoga in the 62nd minute.

Bhayangkara F.C. 
In 2017 he moved to Bhayangkara F.C. The team won 2017 Liga 1 and he was listed as Liga 1 champion although he was loaned to Semen Padang F.C. during the mid-season transfer window.

Persib Bandung 
Muchlis joined Persib Bandung in 2018 on a free transfer. He made his debut against PS-TIRA on 23 March 2018 and scored his only goal for the club against Madura United F.C. on 9 October 2018 when the team lost 1-2. He was retained for 2019 season but did not make a single appearance for the first half of the season.

Bandung United (loan) 
Muchlis was loaned to Persib's feeder club Bandung United F.C. in Liga 2 for a half season to get more playing time. He scored a goal against PSGC Ciamis on 29 August 2019. As Bandung United were relegated to Liga 3, he was released by Persib.

International career 
Muchlis was part of Indonesia U-19 that won 2013 AFF U-19 Youth Championship. He made his debut for the Indonesia U-23 on 9 March 2015 against Vietnam U-23, after replacing Adam Alis Setyano in the 82nd minute. He was also called up to the senior team for 2016 AFF Championship, but he did not play a match for the whole tournament.

Career statistics

Club

International

International goals 
Scores and results list the Indonesia's goal tally first.
Indonesia U-23

Honours

Club 
Bhayangkara FC
 Liga 1: 2017

International
Indonesia U-17
 HKFA International Youth Invitation: 2012
Indonesia U-19
 HKFA International Youth Invitation: 2013
 AFF U-19 Youth Championship: 2013
Indonesia
 AFF Championship runner-up: 2016

References

External links 
 

1996 births
Living people
Indonesian footballers
Indonesia youth international footballers
Association football forwards
PSM Makassar players
Bhayangkara F.C. players
Semen Padang F.C. players
Persib Bandung players
Liga 1 (Indonesia) players
People from Mojokerto
Sportspeople from East Java